Virbia nigricans is a moth in the family Erebidae. It was described by Tryon Reakirt in 1864. It is found in the United States in secondary secession habitats of western New Jersey and Pennsylvania.

The length of the forewings is about 8.2 mm for males and 9.3 mm for females. The male forewings are tawny buff from the base to the postmedial region, fading to clay from the subterminal region to the wing apex. There is a faint umber discal spot. The hindwings are brown from the inner margin to the outer edge. The medial region is tannish peach mixed with ocher from the base along the anterior margin to the postmedial region. There is a brown discal spot. The female forewings are usually the same as in males, but sometimes suffused with orange-rufous scales. The hindwings are usually the same as in males, but some specimens have a large discontinuous dark sepia terminal band. There are two generations per year with adults on wing from late May to June and again from early to mid-August.

References

Moths described in 1864
nigricans